Members of the British Liberal Party's Frontbench Team from 1956 to 1967 (leaderships listed chronologically):

Party Spokesmen under Jo Grimond's First Two Parliaments November 1956–October 1964
Jo Grimond: Party Leader
Donald Wade: Chief Whip

Changes
1958: Mark Bonham Carter becomes Foreign Affairs Spokesman upon election to parliament in March 1958. (Ballot Box to Jury Box: The Life and Times of an English Crown Court Judge). However he lost his seat at the October '59 general election.
1961: Christopher Layton appointed as Economic Spokesman (ref. The Liberal Party and the Economy, 1929-1964)
May 1962: Arthur Holt replaces Donald Wade as Chief Whip
1962: Donald Wade appointed as Deputy Leader of the Liberal Party
1963: Eric Lubbock replaces Arthur Holt as Chief Whip

Party Spokesmen under Jo Grimond's First Two Parliaments October 1964–June1966
Jo Grimond: Party Leader
Eric Lubbock: Chief Whip
Alasdair Mackenzie: Agriculture, Food, Fisheries, Posts and Telecommunications
Alec Peterson: Education Spokesman (ref. again Lib Party and Economy)

Changes
March 1965: Upon election to the House, David Steel becomes Chief Spokesman for Work.
1965: Eric Lubbock is noted as being 'Liberal Aviation Spokesman' in documentation from this time.

Party Spokesmen under Jo Grimond's Final Parliament March 1966–January 1967
Jo Grimond: Party Leader
Eric Lubbock: Chief Whip
Richard Wainwright: Chief Treasury Spokesman
James Davidson: Chief Foreign Affairs and Defence Spokesman
Alasdair Mackenzie: Chief Agriculture, Food, Fisheries, Posts and Telecommunications Spokesman
David Steel: Chief Work Spokesman

Liberal Party (UK)
20th century in the United Kingdom
1956 establishments in the United Kingdom
1967 disestablishments in the United Kingdom